Hugo Ruševljanin (born 4 June 1927) was a Yugoslav football coach. He was most notable as a long serving coach of Novi Sad while the lower ranked Yugoslavian club has entered top flight level. Later, he coached Partizan and FK Vardar. Since 1961, Him, Prvoslav Mihajlović, Ljubomir Lovrić and Milovan Ćirić - have formed the training committee to manage Yugoslavian national football team. In 1963-64 he has remained in same position together with Ljubomir Lovrić.

Influence
Along with managing teams, Ruševljanin was also a mentor to younger coaches, making a huge impact on coaches such as Dragoljub Bekvalac and Milan Živadinović.

References

External links
 article at Slobodna Dalmacija
 article at Politika

1927 births
Possibly living people
Yugoslav football managers
Yugoslavia national football team managers
FK Vardar managers
FK Partizan non-playing staff